Leighton Elliott (born 23 October 1984) is a Caymanian footballer who plays as a defender. He  has represented the Cayman Islands during the 2010 Caribbean Championship and World Cup qualifying matches in 2008 and 2011.

References

Association football defenders
Living people
1984 births
Caymanian footballers
Cayman Islands international footballers
George Town SC players